Vnukovo is a rural locality (a village) in Novoalexandrovskoye Rural Settlement, Suzdalsky District, Vladimir Oblast, Russia. The population was 30 as of 2010. There are 7 streets.

Geography 
Vnukovo is located 38 km southwest of Suzdal (the district's administrative centre) by road. Malakhovo is the nearest rural locality.

References 

Rural localities in Suzdalsky District